WDZQ (95.1 FM 95Q) is a commercial radio station in Decatur, Illinois, serving Central Illinois.  The station broadcasts a country radio format and is currently owned by Neuhoff Corp., through licensee Neuhoff Media Decatur, LLC. Current weekday programming includes the Morning Wakeup with Brittany Campbell, Middays with Robert Urbanek, The Afternoon Drive with Josh Roberts and the Night Shift with Rachel D. 

WDZQ has an effective radiated power (ERP) of 50,000 watts, the maximum for Illinois FM stations.  The transmitter is on North 2400 East Road at East 1900 North Road in Moweaqua.

History
On , the station first signed on the air.  It was owned by the Mumbles Corporation.  Then, as now, it had a country music format, although originally it was largely automated.

WDZQ began streaming its broadcasts over the internet via its website www.95q.com in February 2008.

The station was awarded Medium Market Station of the Year by the Illinois Broadcasters Association in 2015 and 2016.

References

External links

DZQ
Radio stations established in 1980